Elbbrücken station (Elbe bridges station) is a public transit terminal station in Hamburg, Germany, near the railway and road bridges called Elbbrücken leading over the Norderelbe. It consists of two elevated stops, one for the Hamburg U-Bahn underground which opened in 2018, and one for the Hamburg S-Bahn suburban trains which opened a year later. Each stop has two tracks, interlinked by a "skywalk". The station is the terminus of the U4 U-Bahn line and is between Hammerbrook and Veddel on the S3/S31 S-Bahn lines. It was built to provide easier access to the new HafenCity quarter of Hamburg from the south.

Construction and opening
The U-Bahn station was opened in December 7, 2018. The opening of the S-Bahn stop has been delayed due to problems during construction works. While the cost for the U-Bahn section was lower than expected – down from €178 million to €145 million, including the route from the previous station HafenCity Universität – the cost for the S-Bahn stop was expected to rise from €43 million to €57 million. The S-Bahn station was opened to the public on the December 15, 2019.

Gallery

References

Hamburg S-Bahn stations in Hamburg
Hamburg U-Bahn stations in Hamburg
U4 (Hamburg U-Bahn) stations
Buildings and structures in Hamburg-Mitte
Railway stations in Germany opened in 2019